Huy Fong's sriracha sauce ), also referred to as sriracha, rooster sauce or cock sauce for the rooster on its label, is a brand of sriracha, a chili sauce that originated in Thailand. The sauce is produced by Huy Fong Foods, a California manufacturer, and was created in 1980 by David Tran, a Chinese immigrant from Vietnam. Some cookbooks include recipes using it as their main condiment. It can be recognized by its bright red color and its packaging: a clear plastic bottle with a green cap, text in Vietnamese, English, Chinese, and Spanish, and the rooster logo. The logo refers to the Year of the Rooster in the Chinese zodiac, as David Tran was born in 1945. The green cap and rooster logo are trademarked, but the U.S. Patent and Trademark Office considers "sriracha" a generic term.

History 

David Tran began making chili sauces in 1975 in his native Vietnam, where his brother grew chili peppers on a farm north of Saigon. In 1978, the new Communist Vietnamese government began to crack down on ethnic Chinese in south Vietnam. Tran and three thousand other refugees crowded onto the Taiwanese freighter Huey Fong, heading for Hong Kong. After a month-long standoff with the British authorities, its passengers disembarked on January 19, 1979. Tran was granted asylum in the United States. He started Huy Fong Foods in 1980, naming the company after the refugee ship that brought him out of Vietnam. The sauce was initially supplied to Asian restaurants near his base in Chinatown, Los Angeles, but sales grew steadily by word of mouth. In December 2009, Bon Appétit magazine named the sauce Ingredient of the Year for 2010. In 2012, over 20 million bottles were sold. Huy Fong Foods says demand has outpaced supply since the company started making the sauce. The company does not advertise because advertising would widen that gap. Huy Fong has boosted production since 2013. Sriracha sauce has grown from a cult taste to one of the food industry's most popular condiments. It infuses burgers, sushi, snacks, candy, beverages, and even health products. Tran said he was dissuaded from securing a trademark on the word sriracha since it is difficult to obtain one named after a real-life location. This has allowed others to develop their own versions, using the name. Some of the biggest corporations in the business, such as Heinz, Starbucks, Frito-Lay, Applebee's, P.F. Chang's, Pizza Hut, Subway, and Jack in the Box use the name without licensing it. In 2016, Lexus partnered with Huy Fong Foods to build a single promotional Sriracha IS sport sedan.

Composition 

The sauce's recipe has not changed significantly since 1983. The bottle lists the ingredients as: "chili, sugar, salt, garlic, distilled vinegar, potassium sorbate, sodium bisulfite and xanthan gum". Huy Fong Foods' chili sauces are made from fresh, red, jalapeño chili peppers and contain no added water or artificial colors. Garlic powder is used rather than fresh garlic. The company formerly used serrano chilis, but found them difficult to harvest. To keep the sauce hot, the company produces only up to a monthly pre-sold quota in order to use only peppers from known sources. The sauce is certified as kosher by the Rabbinical Council of California. Huy Fong Foods' sriracha sauce ranks in the 1,000–2,500 heat units range, above banana pepper and below Jalapeño pepper, on the Scoville scale used to measure the spicy heat of a chili pepper.

Production 
The production of sriracha sauce begins with growing the chilis. The chilis were grown on Underwood Ranch until the two companies ended their relationship in 2016. In order to make sriracha, the chili peppers are planted in March.

Tran uses a particular type of machinery that reduces waste by mixing rocks, twigs, and unwanted/unusable chilis, back into the soil. The chilis are harvested in mid-July through October and are driven from the farm to the Huy Fong Foods processing facility in Irwindale.

Because Tran does not add food coloring to the sauce, each bottle varies in color. At the beginning of the harvest season, the chilis are greener and therefore, the sauce yields a more muted-red color. Later in the season, the sauce produced is bright red. After the chilis are harvested, they are washed, crushed, and mixed with sugar, salt, garlic, distilled vinegar, potassium sorbate, sodium bisulfite as preservatives, and Xanthan gum. The sauce is loaded into drums and then distributed into bottles. All drums and bottles are manufactured on-site, to reduce waste and emissions.

Lawsuits 
In October 2013, the city of Irwindale, California, filed a lawsuit against the Huy Fong Foods factory after approximately 30 residents of the town complained of the spicy smells the factory was emitting while producing sriracha sauce. The plaintiff initially sought an injunction enjoining Huy Fong from "operating or using" the plant.  On November 27, 2013, Judge Robert H. O'Brien ruled partially in favor of the city, declaring Huy Fong Foods must cease any operations that could be causing the noxious odors and make changes to mitigate them, though he did not order that operations cease completely. According to the judge, although there was a "lack of credible evidence" linking locals' complaints of breathing trouble and watering eyes to the factory, the odor that could be "reasonably inferred to be emanating from the facility" is, for residents, "extremely annoying, irritating and offensive to the senses warranting consideration as a public nuisance." In late January 2014, the city of Irwindale announced it was expanding its case against Huy Fong Foods to include a claim of breach of contract, alleging that the plant violated a condition of its operating permit by emitting harmful odors. The case was scheduled for jury trial in Los Angeles Superior Court on November 3, 2014. On May 29, 2014, it was announced that Irwindale had dropped the lawsuit against Huy Fong Foods.  During the legal battles, a Texas delegation offered incentives to move operations to Denton. Other states had also made offers for potential relocation. There is a history of lawsuits between Huy Fong and Underwood Ranches, its primary supplier of jalapeños since the 1980s. In 2016, Huy Fong overpaid Underwood by $1.46 million. According to Underwood's lawyer, Tran attempted just before this to hire away Underwood's COO in order to form a new chile-growing concern, breaking the trust between Tran and Underwood. Huy Fong sued Underwood for not paying back this overpayment; Underwood countersued for breach of contract. In July 2019, the case was decided generally in favor of Underwood, with a California jury awarding the grower $10 million in punitive damages and $14.8 million to make up for lost contract revenue between 2016 and 2019. However, the jury also decided that Huy Fong's claim of overpayment was valid, so $1.46 million was deducted from the damages.

Legacy 

Filmmaker Griffin Hammond produced a 33-minute documentary about sriracha sauce. It was funded with the help of a Kickstarter campaign which raised $21,009—over four times the goal.  The film was released online on December 11, 2013, in advance of submission to film festivals.

See also 

 List of hot sauces

References

External links 
 
 

American Chinese cuisine
Brand name condiments
Food and drink in California
Hot sauces
Products introduced in 1980
Vietnamese-American history

zh:是拉差香甜辣椒醬